Nakshathrangale Kaaval (English: The Stars Alone Guard Me) is a Malayalam language novel written by P. Padmarajan and published in 1971. The story revolves around the life of a girl as she matures into a woman. It won the Kerala Sahitya Akademi Award for Novel. A film adaptation of the novel was released in 1978 with Jayabharathi and Soman playing the lead characters. It was directed by K. S. Sethumadhavan and scripted by Padmarajan.

References

1971 novels
Malayalam novels
Indian novels adapted into films
Novels set in Kerala
DC Books books
Kerala Sahitya Akademi Award-winning works
1971 Indian novels